One is the Bee Gees' eighteenth studio album (sixteenth worldwide), released in April 1989.

Background and recording
After the European success of their previous album, E.S.P., the Gibb brothers began to work on the One album in early 1988. In March, their brother Andy suddenly died and the Bee Gees took a break until November when they returned to the studio to complete the album, but this time they shifted to Mayfair Studios in London. The style of One was more melancholic than E.S.P., and heavily influenced by the loss of their brother. The album was dedicated to Andy and the song "Wish You Were Here" was written as a tribute to him.

The album was co-produced with Brian Tench, who had worked with them on the previous album. Related session outtake "Shape of Things to Come" was written for the Bee Gees' contribution to the 1988 Olympics album called One Moment in Time released the same year.

Release
The album had varying degrees of success across the world. In Europe, the album reached the top 10 in Germany and Switzerland and reached the top 30 in various other European countries (including the UK) and Australia. North American audiences had still not re-embraced the Bee Gees as they were still regarded as a disco group and the album failed to reach the top 40 in the US and Canada, despite the success of the title track reaching No. 7 in the US and No. 11 in Canada. Other singles from the album included "Bodyguard" and "Tokyo Nights". In the UK, none of the singles from the album reached the top 40.

Track listing
In the US, "Wing and a Prayer" was substituted with the group's European No. 1 hit, "You Win Again".

Personnel
Bee Gees
Barry Gibb – lead, harmony and backing vocals; rhythm guitar
Robin Gibb – lead, harmony and backing vocals
Maurice Gibb – harmony and backing vocals, keyboard, synthesizer, acoustic and electric rhythm guitars, lead vocals (on "House of Shame")

Additional musicians
Peter-John Vettese – keyboards, synthesizer
Tim Cansfield – lead guitar
Alan Kendall – lead guitar; guitar solo on tracks (on "It's My Neighborhood", "Tokyo Nights" and "House of Shame")
Nathan East – bass
Steve Ferrone – drums

Production

Barry Gibb - producer
Robin Gibb - producer
Maurice Gibb - producer
Brian Tench – engineer, mix engineer, producer
Mark Robinson - second engineer
Noel Rafferty - assistant engineer
Scott Glasel – programming and production assistant. Engineering on "Ordinary Lives"
Ross Alexander of Synergetic Services - technical supervisor
George Marino - mastering engineering
Martyn Atkins of T+CP Associates – design and art direction
Larry Williams – cover photography
Peter Corvin-Brittin – inside photography

Charts

Certifications

References

Bee Gees albums
1989 albums
Warner Records albums
Albums produced by Barry Gibb
Albums produced by Robin Gibb
Albums produced by Maurice Gibb